Smiths City is a New Zealand retail chain selling furniture and home appliances. It was originally founded by Henry Cooper Smith in 1918 as City Market initially involved with auctioning grain and product.

History

Early history

In 1918, Henry Cooper Smith established City Market on Colombo Street in Christchurch. The business initially auctioned grain, livestock and general goods, but later began to specialize in new and used furniture and hardware. The business eventually became Smith's City Market, or Smiths City. The flagship Colombo Street store was still operating more than 100 years later, in 2020.

Smiths City opened its first store outside Christchurch, in Filleul Street, Dunedin, in 1977. By March 2020, it had 29 stores.

In 1983, Smiths City purchased 80% of Noel Leeming Television Limited.  Following the company being placed into receivership in 1991, the receivers sold both the North Island division and Noel Leeming Television Limited.

In 2004, Smiths City purchased 80% of local Wellington retailer LV Martin & Son. LV Martin & Son was founded in 1934 as a Wellington household appliance store. LV Martin & Son merged with Smiths City at the end of 2015 with all stores now displaying the Smiths City branding.

COVID-19 pandemic

Smiths City was placed into a trading halt on 27 March 2020, two days into New Zealand's COVID-19 lockdown, after it was initially denied permission to operate as an essential business. It held talks with its primary lender ASB Bank, and the bank agreed to delay a debt repayment. However, the company's share price plunged when the trading halt ended on the following trading day, 30 March.

The company's Blenheim store, the largest tenant of Marlborough District Council, was given a rent discount during the lockdown. Within the first week of the lockdown, the company was also given permission to sell essential goods online.

In May 2020, Smiths City undertook a major restructure due to the ongoing impact of the virus. The board voted to go into receivership to fast-track a potential sale without time-consuming shareholder approval. It laid off 115 workers, about a quarter of its national workforce. It also closed seven of its 29 stores.

The chain's remaining stores were sold to new owners later the same month. The sale took place over Zoom, without the buyer being able to visit any physical stores.

2020 relaunch

The new owners closed Smiths City's operations in Auckland, where it had struggled against Australian rival chains like Harvey Norman and Freedom Furniture.

In June 2020, Smiths City opened its first new store after going into receivership in Petone. The store is the only store in the Wellington region following the closures of the previous three branches; Lower Hutt, Porirua and Kapiti.

In July 2020, Smiths City opened a new flagship store at The Colombo Shopping Centre in Sydenham. The original flagship store, on nearby Colombo Street, remained open.

In August 2020, Smiths City moved its Dunedin store from Andersons Bay Road in South Dunedin, where it had been for 14 years, to the Meridian Mall in the city's CBD, where Kmart had moved out after 23 years.

By October 2020, the company had returned to profit, had recruited more staff, and had plans to open another five stores.

References

Furniture retailers of New Zealand
Consumer electronics retailers of New Zealand
Retail companies established in 1918
Companies based in Christchurch